The EFL League Two play-offs are a series of play-off matches contested by the association football teams finishing from fourth to seventh in EFL League Two, the fourth tier of the English football league system. They are part of the annual English Football League play-offs. , the play-offs comprise two semi-finals, where the team finishing fourth plays the team finishing seventh, and the team finishing fifth plays the team finishing sixth, each conducted as a two-legged tie. The winners of the semi-finals progress to the final which is contested at Wembley Stadium.

For the first three years, the play-off final took place over two legs, played at both side's grounds. Aldershot won the first League One play-off final in 1987, beating Wolverhampton Wanderers 2–1 on aggregate.  From 1990, the play-off final was a one-off match, hosted at the original Wembley Stadium, while from 2001 to 2006, the final was played at the Millennium Stadium in Cardiff as Wembley was being rebuilt. Since 2007, the match has been hosted at Wembley Stadium except for the 2011 final which took place at Old Trafford to avoid a clash with the 2011 UEFA Champions League Final.

When the fourth tier play-offs were first contested in 1987, they were known as the Football League Fourth Division play-offs. From 1993 to 2004, following the creation of the FA Premier League as a breakaway from the Football League, the competition became known as the Third Division play-offs, and since 2005 has taken its current name as the League Two play-offs following a rebranding of the remaining three divisions of the Football League.

Format

, the League Two play-offs involve the four teams that finish directly below the automatic promotion places in EFL League Two, the fourth tier of the English football league system.  These teams meet in a series of play-off matches to determine the final team that will be promoted to the EFL Championship.  The team finishing in fourth place plays the seventh-placed team in a two-legged tie, while the team in fifth plays the sixth-placed team over two legs, referred to as the "play-off semi-finals".  The first match of the semi-finals is played at the side with the lower league position's home ground while the second match takes place at the higher-ranking side's ground.  According to the EFL, "this is designed to give the highest finishing team an advantage".

The winner of each semi-final is determined by the aggregate score across the two legs, with the number of goals scored in each match of the tie being added together.  The team with the higher aggregate score qualifies for the final.  If, at the end of regular 90 minutes of the second leg, the aggregate score is level then the match goes into extra time where two 15-minute halves are played. If the score remains level at the end of extra time, the tie is decided by a penalty shootout.  The away goals rule does not apply in the play-off semi-finals.

The clubs that win the semi-finals then meet at Wembley Stadium, a neutral venue, for a one-off match referred to as the "play-off final".  If required, extra time and a penalty shootout can be employed in the same manner as for the semi-finals to determine the winner.  The runner-up and losing semi-finalists remain in League Two while the winning side are promoted.  The match, along with the finals of the Championship and League One play-offs, usually takes place over the long weekend of the second bank holiday in May.

Background

The mid-1980s saw a decline in attendances at football matches and public disenchantment with English football.  A number of instances of violence and tragedy struck the game. In March 1985, at the semi-final of the 1984–85 Football League Cup between Chelsea and Sunderland, more than 100 people were arrested after various invasions of the Stamford Bridge pitch and more than 40 people, including 20 policemen, were injured. Nine days later, violence flared at the FA Cup match between Millwall and Luton Town; seats were used as missiles against the police and resulted in Luton Town banning away supporters.  On 11 May, 56 people were killed and 265 injured in the Bradford City stadium fire.  Less than three weeks later, 39 supporters died and more than 600 were injured in the Heysel Stadium disaster where Liverpool were playing Juventus in the European Cup final.

In an attempt to persuade fans to return to the stadia, the Football League had rejected a £19million television deal to broadcast matches live on the BBC and ITV before the 1985–86 Football League season, with League president Jack Dunnett suggesting that "football is prepared to have a year or two with no television".  In December 1985, the "Heathrow Agreement" was agreed which aimed to revitalise the financial affairs of the league.  It was a ten-point plan which included a structural reorganisation of the league, reducing the top tier from 22 clubs to 20, and the introduction of play-offs to facilitate the change.  The play-offs were introduced to the end of the 1986–87 Football League season.  They were initially introduced for two years with the proviso that if they were successful with the general public, they would be retained permanently.

History

In the first two seasons, the team one place above the relegation zone in the Third Division, along with the three clubs below the automatic promotion positions in the Fourth Division, took part in the play-offs. In the inaugural play-offs in 1987, Third Division Bolton Wanderers were eliminated in the semi-finals by Fourth Division side Aldershot who replaced them when they won the final. The following season, Rotherham United also swapped places with Fourth Division opposition when they lost to Swansea City in the semi-finals who defeated Torquay in the final 5–4 on aggregate. 

The primary objective of the play-offs was achieved within the first two seasons, namely the reorganisation of the four leagues with 20 clubs in the first tier and 24 in the second to fourth tiers.  However, the popularity of the play-offs was such that the post-season games were retained and the play-offs were the first to feature four teams from the Fourth Division: Leyton Orient defeated Wrexham over two legs in the 1989 Football League Fourth Division play-off final. From 1990, the format of the final changed to a single match played at a neutral venue, initially the original Wembley Stadium.  The first winners of the inaugural one-off final were Cambridge United who beat Chesterfield 1–0 in front of 26,404 spectators.

Wembley underwent renovations early in the 21st century and the 2000 final was the last to be hosted at the original stadium.  Subsequently the finals were hosted at the Millennium Stadium in Cardiff, where Blackpool won their second fourth-tier play-off final, beating Leyton Orient 4–2 in the final watched by a crowd of 23,600.  The Millennium Stadium held the finals until 2007 when the match was moved to the renovated Wembley Stadium, the first such final seeing Bristol Rovers defeat Shrewsbury Town 3–1 with an attendance of 61,589.

The game was relocated to Manchester United's ground, Old Trafford, for a single season as a result of a scheduling clash with the 2011 UEFA Champions League Final.  The most recent final, in 2020, was held behind closed doors as a result of the COVID-19 pandemic in the United Kingdom: Northampton Town defeated Exeter City 4–0 in front of an official attendance of 0.

Since the first play-off final, the third tier of English football's league itself has undergone a number of re-brands.  In 1993, the Premier League was formed, a move which caused the fourth-tier league to be renamed as the Third Division.  In 2004, the Third Division was re-branded as Football League Two, before the League's adoption of English Football League (EFL) led to a 2016 renaming as the EFL League Two.

Prize
The financial value of winning the EFL League Two play-off is derived from the additional remuneration clubs receive in League One.  , clubs in League One receive around £675,000 from the Premier League as a "core club" payment compared to £450,000 in League Two.  The winners of the final receive a trophy.

Winners and semi-finalists

Records
Blackpool have been promoted from the fourth tier of English football by winning the play-off final on three occasions, more than any other team, while Cheltenham Town, Northampton Town and Southend United have won two finals.  Both Exeter City and Torquay United have lost in the final three times.

Notes

References

Bibliography

Play-Offs
League Two